The following are the national records in athletics in Bahamas maintained by Bahamas' national athletics federation: Bahamas Association of Athletic Associations (BAAA).

Outdoor
Key to tables:

+ = en route to a longer distance

h = hand timing

A = affected by altitude

X =  due to doping violation

y = denotes one mile

Men

Women

Indoor

Men

Women

Junior

Men
Key:

Women

Notes

References
General
World Athletics Statistic Handbook 2022: National Outdoor Records
World Athletics Statistic Handbook 2022: National Indoor Records
Bahamian Senior Outdoor Records 20 February 2016 updated
Bahamian Junior Outdoor Records 20 February 2016 updated
Specific

External links
Bahamas Athletics web site

Bahamas
Athletics
Athletics in the Bahamas
Athletics